Plenasium javanicum is a fern in the family Osmundaceae. The genus Plenasium is recognized in the Pteridophyte Phylogeny Group classification of 2016 (PPG I); however, some sources place all Plenasium species in a more broadly defined Osmunda, treating this species as Osmunda javanica. It has a wide native distribution in south-eastern Asia, being found in the Eastern Himalaya, south-central and south east China (including Hainan), Indochina, the Philippines, Borneo, Sumatra, Sulawesi and Java.

References

Osmundales
Flora of East Himalaya
Flora of South-Central China
Flora of Southeast China
Flora of Hainan
Flora of Indo-China
Flora of Malesia
Plants described in 1828